The list of ship commissionings in 2000 includes a chronological list of all ships commissioned in 2000.


References

See also 

2000
 Ship commissionings